Ladies' Night in a Turkish Bath is a 1928 American silent comedy film directed by Edward F. Cline.<ref>[http://www.afi.com/members/catalog/DetailView.aspx?s=&Movie=10120 The AFI Catalog of Feature Films: Ladies' Night in a Turkish Bath]</ref> It is based on the 1920 play Ladies' Night by Charlton Andrews and Avery Hopwood. It was released on April 1, 1928 by First National Pictures.

Cast
Dorothy Mackaill as Helen Slocum
Jack Mulhall as "Speed" Dawson
Sylvia Ashton as Ma Slocum
James Finlayson as Pa Slocum
Guinn "Big Boy" Williams as Sweeney
Harvey Clark as Mr. Spivens
Reed Howes as Edwin Leroy
Ethel Wales as Mrs. Spivens
Fred Kelsey as Detective
Andreva Nunée as Dancer (uncredited)
Fred Toones as Barbershop Attendant (uncredited)

Preservation
A copy of Ladies' Night in a Turkish Bath'' is housed at the UCLA Film and Television Archive.

References

External links

1928 films
American silent feature films
1928 comedy films
Silent American comedy films
Films directed by Edward F. Cline
American black-and-white films
Films produced by Edward Small
1920s American films